In molecular biology, U81 (also sometimes called Z23 snoRNA) is a member of the C/D class of snoRNA which contain the C (UGAUGA) and D (CUGA) box motifs. U81 acts as a guanine methylation guide and is found in intron 11 of the gas5 gene in mammals.

References

External links 
 

Small nuclear RNA